Kochkovsky District is an administrative and municipal district (raion), one of the thirty in Novosibirsk Oblast, Russia. It is located in the south of the oblast. Its administrative center is the rural locality (a selo) of Kochki. Population: 14,863 (2010 Census);  The population of Kochki accounts for 27.3% of the district's total population.

Notable residents 

 Piotr Nazarov (1921–1988), painter and art teacher

References

Notes

Sources

Districts of Novosibirsk Oblast